A shrunken head is a severed and specially prepared human head that is used for trophy, ritual, or trade purposes.

Headhunting has occurred in many regions of the world, but the practice of headshrinking has only been documented in the northwestern region of the Amazon rainforest. Jivaroan peoples, which includes the Shuar, Achuar, Huambisa and Aguaruna tribes from Ecuador and Peru, are known to keep shrunken human heads.

Shuar people call a shrunken head a tsantsa, also transliterated tzantza. Many tribe leaders would display their heads to scare enemies.

Shrunken heads are known for their mandibular prognathism, facial distortion and shrinkage of the lateral sides of the forehead; these are artifacts of the shrinking process.  Among the Shuar and Achuar, the reduction of the heads was followed by a series of feasts centered on important rituals.

Technique
 

The process of creating a shrunken head begins with removing the skull from the neck. An incision is made on the back of the ear and all the skin and flesh is removed from the cranium. Red seeds are placed underneath the nostrils and the lips are sewn shut. The mouth is held together with three palm pins. Fat from the flesh of the head is removed. Then a wooden ball is placed under the flesh to keep the form. The flesh is then boiled in water that has been saturated with a number of herbs containing tannins. The head is then dried with hot rocks and sand while molding it to retain its human features. The skin is then rubbed with charcoal ash. Decorative beads may be added to the head.

In the head shrinking tradition, it is believed that coating the skin in ash keeps the muisak, or avenging soul, from seeping out.

Significance 

The practice of preparing shrunken heads originally had religious significance; shrinking the head of an enemy was believed to harness the spirit of that enemy and compel him to serve the shrinker. It was said to prevent the soul from avenging his death.

Shuar believed in the existence of three fundamental spirits:
Wakani – innate to humans thus surviving their death.
Arutam – literally "vision" or "power", protects humans from a violent death.
Muisak – vengeful spirit, which surfaces when a person carrying an Arutam spirit is murdered.

To block a Muisak spirit from using its powers, they severed their enemies' heads and shrank them. The process also served as a way of warning their enemies. Despite these precautions, the owner of the trophy did not keep it for long. Many heads were later used in religious ceremonies and feasts that celebrated the victories of the tribe. Accounts vary as to whether the heads were discarded or stored.

Trade 
When Westerners created an economic incentive for shrunken heads there was a sharp increase in the rate of killings in an effort to supply tourists and collectors of ethnographic items. The terms 'headhunting' and 'headhunting parties' come from this practice.

Guns were usually what the Shuar acquired in exchange for their shrunken heads, the rate being one gun per head. But weapons were not the only items exchanged. Around 1910, shrunken heads were being sold by a curio shop in Lima for one Peruvian gold pound, equal in value to a British gold sovereign. In 1919, the price in Panama's curio shop for shrunken heads had risen to £5. By the 1930s, when heads were freely exchanged, a shrunken head could be purchased for about 25 U.S. dollars. This was stopped when the Peruvian and Ecuadorian governments cooperated to outlaw head trafficking.

Also encouraged by this trade, people in Colombia and Panama unconnected to the Jívaros began to make counterfeit tsantsas. They used corpses from morgues, or the heads of monkeys or sloths. Some used goatskin. Kate Duncan wrote in 2001 that "It has been estimated that about 80 percent of the tsantsas in private and museum hands are fraudulent", including almost all that are female or which include an entire torso rather than just a head.

Thor Heyerdahl recounts in The Kon-Tiki Expedition (1948) the various problems of getting into the Jívaro (Shuar) area in Ecuador to get balsa wood for his expedition raft. Local people would not guide his team into the jungle for fear of being killed and having their heads shrunk. In 1951 and 1952 sales of such items in London were being advertised in The Times, one example being priced at $250, a hundredfold appreciation since the early 20th century.

In 1999, the National Museum of the American Indian repatriated the authentic shrunken heads in its collection to Ecuador. Most other countries have also banned the trade. Currently, replica shrunken heads are manufactured as curios for the tourist trade. These are made from leather and animal hides formed to resemble the originals. In 2019 Mercer University repatriated a shrunken head from their collections crediting the Native American Graves Protection and Repatriation Act as inspiration.

In 2020, Oxford University’s Pitt Rivers Museum removed its collection of shrunken heads after an ethical review begun in 2017.

In popular culture 

In 1955, Disneyland opens its Jungles Cruise ride. The attraction features a trader selling shrunken heads (three of his for one of yours).

In 1975, Whiting (a Milton Bradley company) released Vincent Price's Shrunken Head Apple Sculpture Kit.

One of the North American television commercials for the 1990 video game Dr. Mario featured head shrinking, as well as a cover of the song Witch Doctor with slightly different lyrics.

In the 2004 film adaptation of Harry Potter and the Prisoner of Azkaban, Lenny Henry voices Dre Head, a Jamaican accented shrunken head on the magical Knight Bus. The same film features three more shrunken heads, voiced by Brian Bowles and Peter Serafinowicz, inside the wizard pub The Three Broomsticks.

See also
Mokomokai, preserved Māori heads also used as trade goods

Notes

References 
 .

External links

Anthropology
Decapitation
Ecuadorian culture
Human head and neck
History of Ecuador
History of Peru
Human trophy collecting
Indigenous culture of the Amazon
Jivaroan peoples
Mummies
Peruvian culture
Religious objects